The Mystery of Death, also known as The Mystery of Death: Pisces Jade Pendant, is a 2015 Chinese adventure suspense thriller film directed by Ben Wong. It was released on February 6, 2015.

Cast
Deric Wan
Huang Zheng
Josephine Yu
Sui Shuyang
Yang Xinrui

Reception
By February 9, 2015, the film had earned  at the Chinese box office.

References

2010s adventure thriller films
Chinese adventure thriller films